Cotesworth is a historic mansion in North Carrollton, Mississippi, United States.

Location
The mansion is located on Old Grenada Road in North Carrollton, Carroll County, Mississippi.

History
The mansion was built as an inn in the 1840s. In 1847, it was acquired by local lawyer and future United States Senator James Zachariah George, who turned it into a Greek Revival mansion. He named it after Charles Cotesworth Pinckney.

Two decades after the end of the American Civil War, Senator George built "a free-standing hexagonal library" on the grounds.

The mansion stayed in Senator George's family until 2013, when Katharine Saunders Williams, his great-great-granddaughter, donated it to establish the Cotesworth Culture and Heritage Center.

Heritage significance
It has been listed on the National Register of Historic Places since June 9, 1978.

References

Houses on the National Register of Historic Places in Mississippi
Houses in Carroll County, Mississippi
Greek Revival houses in Mississippi
Houses completed in 1847
1847 establishments in Mississippi
National Register of Historic Places in Carroll County, Mississippi